The Burton Bridge is a steel through arch crossing the Saint John River between Maugerville and Burton, New Brunswick, Canada. The bridge connects routes 102 and 105 (formerly the Trans-Canada Highway), but has no numerical designation of its own.

The bridge opened in 1973, replacing a cable ferry service in the area; and is 765 metres [2509 feet] in length, and 56 metres [185 feet] tall.

In 1993, a 13-year-old boy fell from the bridge.

See also 
 List of bridges in Canada

References

Road bridges in New Brunswick
Transport in Sunbury County, New Brunswick
Buildings and structures in Sunbury County, New Brunswick
Bridges over the Saint John River (Bay of Fundy)
Bridges completed in 1973
Through arch bridges in the United States
Steel bridges in Canada